Aenos may refer to

the ancient city of Ainos in Thrace, today's Enez
Mount Ainos, a mountain on the island Cephalonia, Greece
, a number of ships with this name